The London Broncos are a professional rugby league club in London, England. 

The club competes in the RFL Championship. It was a member of Super League from its inaugural season in 1996 until the end of the 2014 season, when they were relegated to the Championship. They returned to the Super League after achieving promotion by winning the Million Pound Game against the Toronto Wolfpack in 2018, but were relegated back to the Championship at the end of the 2019 Super League season after finishing 12th.

The club was originally formed in 1980 as Fulham Rugby League Club and entered the Second Division for the 1980–81 season.

The club has also previously been known as London Crusaders (1991–1994), London Broncos (between 1994–2005, and since 2012) and Harlequins Rugby League (2006–2011).

Whilst the club has never won a major trophy, they were finalists in the 1999 Challenge Cup and finished the 1997 Super League season in second place. The first trophy the club has won since its formation in 1980 was the Second Division in 1982–83, with the second trophy being for the Million Pound Game in 2018.

In 2021, a ground-share agreement for Plough Lane in Wimbledon, as tenants of EFL League One football club AFC Wimbledon was approved. While negotiations about the use of Plough Lane continued in the 2021 season, the team played its fixtures at Trailfinders Sports Ground.

History

Origins

Professional rugby league was briefly represented in London in the 1930s by London Highfield (1933), Acton and Willesden (1935–36) and Streatham and Mitcham (1935–36). All were speculative clubs set up by local businessmen purely as money making exercises, and were ultimately driven out of business through poor finances. Thereafter, the sport of rugby league in England remained exclusively a northern game for over forty years, until the formation in 1980 of a new club in London, Fulham.

1980–1991: Fulham R.L.F.C.
In June 1980, Fulham Football Club chairman Ernie Clay, set up a rugby league team at Craven Cottage, with the primary intention of creating another income stream for the football club. Warrington director Harold Genders, who had helped to persuade Clay of the benefits of starting a rugby league club in the capital, resigned from the Warrington board to become managing director of Fulham R.L.F.C. The Rugby Football League (RFL), keen to encourage the expansion of the sport beyond its traditional Northern heartland, accepted the new club at once. One of the game's leading players, Reg Bowden, was recruited by Genders to act as player-coach and the club's first signing was Roy Lester on a free transfer from Warrington. Within nine weeks, Genders and Bowden had assembled a team of highly experienced players approaching retirement, together with a few promising youngsters. 

The first match, on 14 September 1980, was a major success; nearly 10,000 Londoners turned up for the game at Craven Cottage to see the newly formed side convincingly beat highly regarded Wigan 24–5. On 15 February 1981, more than 15,000 were present to see Fulham take on Wakefield Trinty in the Challenge Cup, a club attendance record that still stands. The new Fulham RL team quickly proved to be very competitive and went on to win promotion at the end of their inaugural season. After that initial success, however, immediate relegation from the first division in 1981–82 was something of a reality check.

Fulham played two "home" games against Swinton and Huddersfield at Widnes in 1983 as the pitch at the Cottage had disintegrated in the wet winter following the collapse of the main drain to the River Thames under the Miller Stand.

The club also played several one-off games in 1983 at various football grounds around London; matches were played at Wealdstone's Lower Mead stadium, Hendon's Claremont Road ground, Brentford's Griffin Park and Chelsea's Stamford Bridge.

Despite winning the Division Two Championship comfortably in 1982–83, a second immediate relegation in 1983–84, coupled with continuing financial losses, saw Clay, under pressure from the Fulham football club board, pull the plug at the end of their fourth season. However, with the backing of supporters Roy and Barbara Close and the appointment of a new coach, former player Roy Lester, Fulham RL still had a future. Most of the existing players moved on as free agents, and a new squad began life based at the Crystal Palace National Sports Centre for the 1984–85 season.

After a single season, the club then moved to a new home at Chiswick Polytechnic Sports Ground in the summer of 1985, and would remain there for five years. Bill Goodwin replaced Lester as coach from 1986 to 1987. In August 1986, Fulham hit a serious cash crisis and were forced to withdraw temporarily from the RFL only 11 days before the start of the season, but were able to re-launch in September.  Bev Risman was appointed coach at Fulham in 1987. The team was in the bottom half of the second division and continually struggled for success, and Risman left after a couple of seasons and Bill Goodwin returned. Phil Sullivan was coach for just two months between January and February 1989, thereafter Goodwin came in for his third spell and held the reins until May 1989 when Ross Strudwick was appointed.

The club returned to the Crystal Palace National Sports Centre in 1990, this time making it their home for three seasons.

In May 1991, York and Fulham toured Russia.

1991–1994: London Crusaders
Prior to the start of the 1991–92 season the club's name was officially changed from Fulham RLFC to London Crusaders RLFC. A slightly more successful period on the pitch begun at this point. Ross Strudwick was replaced as coach by Darryl van der Velde in 1992 but continued as club manager until 1993.

In June 1993 the club moved once again, from Crystal Palace National Sports Centre to Barnet Copthall arena. In November 1993, London Crusaders imposed a 20% pay cut on all staff to ease financial problems. With the club in financial straights, the RFL briefly took ownership of the Crusaders in 1993–94 to protect their southern outpost, but the club were then acquired by new owners Britannic Shipping; Strudwick stepped down as manager to give the club's new owners a clean slate.

Despite the club's financial problems, the team proved very competitive on the pitch under coach Tony Gordon and narrowly missed out on automatic promotion back to the First Division by a single point. The climax of the Crusaders' era was a May 1994 appearance in the Divisional Premiership Final at Old Trafford; although they lost 22–30 to Workington Town, the club had gone into the game with the knowledge that an exciting take-over bid had just been announced.

1994–2005: London Broncos

In the spring of 1994, just prior to the Divisional Premiership Final, it was announced that the successful Australian NRL club Brisbane Broncos was buying the London Crusaders club, which would be renamed London Broncos from the start of the forthcoming 1994–95 season. Gordon was replaced by a Brisbane coach, Gary Grienke. The first home game under the new Broncos moniker was against Keighley at Hendon F.C.'s ground at Claremont Road, though most home games were still played at Barnet Copthall.

For the 1995–96 season the club found another new home base, returning to south-west London at The Stoop Memorial Ground, home of Harlequins Rugby Union Club. Despite finishing fourth in the Second Division the previous season, London Broncos were selected by the RFL to be part of the radical new Super League competition scheduled to begin in the summer of 1996, on the basis that the RFL felt it was commercially essential for the sport's national profile to have a team based in the nation's capital. The regular 1995–96 season, deliberately made brief to accommodate for Super League, ran from August 1995 to January 1996 and saw London included together with the top ten teams from the 1994–95 First Division in a 'Centenary League Championship', effectively a "dry run" for Super League. Faced with much stronger opposition, London struggled and finished second from last.

The club moved once more prior to the start of the 1996 inaugural summer season of Super League, this time to south-east London to play at the Valley, home of Charlton Athletic, which is when current owner David Hughes initially became involved with the club. Former Brisbane Bronco Tony Currie was appointed to the role of head coach. The club performed far beyond expectations and finally finished a highly creditable fourth, with Greg Barwick the top points scorer for the club. That season also brought the best London attendances since the first season at Craven Cottage. Tony Rea retired from playing to take up the Chief Executive role at the club.
 
After only one season, they were on their way back to south-west London to play at the Stoop Memorial Ground again for the 1997 season. The second season of Super League saw an even greater improvement in the team's performance, finishing a remarkable second to the eventual champions, Bradford Bulls. This represents London's best ever final league position to date. Richard Branson's highly successful Virgin Group became majority shareholders in the club, and the immediate future looked very bright. Highlights that year included victories at the Stoop over Canberra in the World Club Challenge and comprehensive league victories against Bradford and Wigan.

In 1998, as part of rugby league's "on the road" scheme London Broncos played Bradford Bulls at Tynecastle in Edinburgh in front of over 7,000 fans. Success continued in 1998 with a first appearance in the Challenge Cup semi-finals, losing to Wigan. Head coach Tony Currie left the club at the end of the 1998 Super League season and was replaced by Dan Stains.

In 1999, the club went one better in the Challenge Cup. Following a famous last-minute semi-final victory over Castleford, the Broncos reached the Challenge Cup Final at Wembley Stadium for the first time, but despite taking a shock early lead and performing bravely, they were soundly defeated 52–16 by red-hot favourites Leeds.

The club returned to the Valley for the 2000 season, but sacked Stains after enduring a long losing streak. Tony Rea was appointed temporary joint head coach with Stains' assistant Les Kiss. Rea and Kiss managed to steer Broncos out of the slump. In 2000, the experienced John Monie was appointed Head Coach. Monie only stayed in the job until the last month of the 2000 Super League season with the club having had mediocre results during his tenure. Rea took over as caretaker coach until the end of the season and Broncos eventually reached mid-table security. Rea then resigned his Chief Executive role at the end of the 2000 season to become Head Coach on a full-time basis.

York made an approach to the Virgin Group to buy the London Broncos in August 2001, with the aim of buying a Super League place for a proposed merged club to be based in York under a new name, York Wasps. This attempt was thrown out when Richard Branson rebuffed the offer as 'ridiculous, and speculative at best'.

In 2002, fervent club supporter David Hughes purchased the majority shareholding from Virgin in a major restructuring of the club. The Broncos moved once again, to play their home matches at Griffin Park as tenants of Brentford FC. 2003 marked the club's first Super League playoff appearance, losing in the first round to St. Helens 24–6 at Knowsley Road.

The 2005 season was marked by significant activity off the pitch as the club welcomed new chairman and majority shareholder Ian Lenagan who had bought 65% of the shares. This was followed by the announcement of a partnership with Harlequins Rugby Union Club that saw the club return to The Stoop Memorial Ground, this time formally renamed as Harlequins RL and adopting the host club's kit and crest for the 2006 season.

2006–2011: Harlequins Rugby League

Ian Lenagan became the majority shareholder in the London Broncos in July 2005 and within a week of his arrival, the team was formally renamed "Harlequins RL". Press releases of the time suggested that this would make the combined club "a powerhouse in both codes" according to Mark Evans of the Union club and provide a "very, very strong future for rugby league in the capital" according to Lenagan.  The arrangement between the clubs was described as a "long-term partnership".

At the time of the announcement there were many projected benefits of the clubs sharing and pooling; both clubs were to play at the same ground and have access to the training facilities at the Richardson Evans Playing Fields, Roehampton Vale, though as a home venue for the Harlequin Amateurs, this was not actually fit for a professional club of either code. In practice, there was no integration between the codes, no joint player development, and the administrative and commercial resources sharing was little more than allowing the RL club to have some shared office space.

The sole integration programme appeared to be a combined fund raising lottery – which folded long before the Rugby League club permanently left the Twickenham Stoop – and two "double header" match days. These were in 2006, in which the Union side played first, followed by the League side, but the two hour gap between fixtures was a deterrent to the Union supporters and the majority had left the ground before the kick-off of the League fixture. Plymouth Albion and Leeds Carnegie were the Union opponents for the Union team whilst the Rugby League team played Huddersfield and St Helens.

On field, the Harlequins RL club started with an encouraging 8,213 watching the home game against St Helens on 11 February 2006 but a heavy loss was followed by further consecutive home losses against Wakefield and Castleford before a thumping 0–60 home defeat to Leeds. It was not until the fifth home game in the season that the team won at the Twickenham Stoop against Catalans Dragons in round 9.

Whilst the club started with a goal of 5,500 average home ground attendance by mid 2007. the actual attendance average was around the 3,500 level.

A 38–18 loss against bottom of the table Catalan, who were in their first year in Super League, was followed by a close home defeat to a Wigan team after each team scored. Harlequins were at this point 9th out of 12.

On 8 July 2006, Ian Lenagan removed Tony Rea as head coach, and moved him "upstairs" to a position on the club's board of directors. In his place, Brian McDermott, an assistant coach at Leeds Rhinos, was appointed as head coach. Results at home improved, taking Harlequins RL to 7th place in Super League XI. 

The 2007 season saw the team pull off an incredible opening win against St Helens and by 7 July the team was 5th in the table, but a collapse in form in the second half of the season – a recurring theme of the McDermott reign – saw the team win only once from eight matches to finish 9th.

At the end of the season, Ian Lenagan took over control of fellow Super League side Wigan Warriors and was given two years to sell his Harlequins shares.

In 2008, Harlequins RL got off to a good start, winning six from the first ten games, but as was customary a second half of the season collapse saw the club won only five from the last seventeen games to finish in 9th again.

In 2009, the club was playing very well in the early part of the season, which extended up until 12 June with ten wins from sixteen, but yet again the rest of the season proved miserable with one win from 12 seeing the club slide from 5th position to 11th.

Home supporters were particularly displeased with the 0–48 home loss to Castleford and the 0–36 half time score v Bradford.

By round 12 in 2010, the club had won only one game from the first eleven and were bottom of the table, meaning that McDermott had seen the team win just twice in twenty three games, and at half-time away at Wigan the team were losing 24–6 before pulling off their finest comeback as Harlequins RL to win 38–26. That result seemed to spur the team into life briefly, with three more wins from the next four, but after that there was an end-of-season collapse to join the start-of-season collapse.

The round 25 game at Catalan saw the Quins bottom of the table with Catalan on a similar points tally and the game looked likely to decide who would finish bottom. The Quins were winning 16–12 with just a couple of minutes to go when Catalan were over the line with ball in hand, but Will Sharp stripped the ball from the Dragons player and Quins managed to hold out for the win.

The final game under McDermott saw Harlequins lose to Warrington at home; 7 wins from his last 38 games.

It was a shock to Harlequins RL supporters to see McDermott's assistant take over but this bizarre decision seemed to be warranted as Rob Powell oversaw three wins from their first three matches, placing them at the top of the ladder.

Away wins at Leeds Rhinos and St Helens seemed to herald a new dawn, however, the club's run of success was ended with a club record 82–6 defeat to Warrington Wolves on 20 March 2011 and the team were within a try of losing by the all-time Super League record margin of −80 held by Salford City Reds.

After that the Harlequins only won two more games in the next six months and the Harlequins RL era drew to a close when the club played St Helens in their final game under that name on 10 September 2011.

2012–present: Return to London Broncos
The club announced on 1 November 2011 that it would be returning to the London Broncos name from the 2012 season. In addition, the team unveiled a new logo as well as new colours of black, light blue and silver. On 4 February, London Broncos played their first competitive match against St. Helens since reverting to that name. The game was won by St. Helens 34–24 in front of a 4,924 crowd, which was higher than all of their attendances in the year before. In the match, seven players made their debuts for the club.

In the 2012 season, the Broncos played two home games "on the road" away from the Twickenham Stoop, on 6 June vs Bradford at Leyton Orient FC's Brisbane Road, where they were narrowly beaten 22–29 in front of 2,844 fans, and on 20 June vs Hull F.C. at Gillingham FC's Priestfield Stadium, as recognition for the work Medway Dragons had done in growing rugby league in Kent. The game proved to be popular with 3,930 turning up to watch London narrowly beaten 12–14 by Hull.

Tony Rea was appointed as the club's head coach for a second time in August 2012 taking over from Rob Powell. In 2013, London Broncos used four venues for their home games with the majority being played at the Twickenham Stoop. On 8 June 2013, London once again played a home game at Priestfield Stadium, this time being heavily beaten 82–10 by Warrington in front of 3,041 fans. On 28 March, London had to play a home game at Esher RFC's ground at Molesey Road due to a waterlogged pitch at the Stoop. For the next home game on 6 April, Harlequins RU didn't allow London to use the Stoop due to a Heineken Cup game, forcing them to play Bradford at Adams Park in High Wycombe.

London Broncos had a successful Challenge Cup campaign in 2013, reaching the semi-finals for the first time since their Wembley appearance in 1999. In round 4, London beat part-timers Featherstone Rovers 24–12 and in round 5, defeated Bradford 25–16. In the quarter-finals, London Broncos beat part-timers Sheffield Eagles 29–10 to book a place in the semi-finals. On 27 July, London Broncos' dream of reaching the Wembley final for the second time came emphatically to an end with a televised 0–70 defeat by Wigan, a record score in a Challenge Cup semi-final.

On 29 June 2013, London Broncos announced the loan signing of Australian Jamie Soward until the end of the season. Soward quickly became a fans favourite with a man of the match performance on his debut v Salford (scoring a try and kicking five goals) and received a standing ovation from the crowd despite being defeated 30–44. Soward put in impressive performances in his short venture in England and in 9 games scored 67 points (5 tries, 23 goals, 1 drop goal).

The club's financial struggles were made evident when, on 20 November 2013, the club announced that it would have to enter administration in ten working days if a new owner was not found. On 3 December 2013, London Broncos announced, "The club will be instructing lawyers to file a further notice of intention to appoint administrators at court, which shall be effective for 10 business days". The club's saviour David Hughes later decided to carry on putting millions into the club.

On 13 December 2013, London Broncos announced a move to the Hive Stadium in Canons Park, the new home of Barnet F.C., from the start of the 2014 season. After London lost 21 players from their 2013 squad, they faced a huge task to build up their squad again with minimal finances. The Broncos managed to retain twelve players from 2013 and in the off season signed 16 players (five on loan) including Tongan international fullback Nesiasi Mataitonga and former England international hooker Scott Moore. Tony Rea quit as coach following Broncos' 11-game winless start to the new Super League season. Assistant coach Joey Grima became head coach, having been asked to take charge for the rest of the season and next.Rea replaced by Grima at Broncos. Despite several closely contested games in 2014, the team struggled throughout the season against teams with far more strength in depth and much greater financial resources, and finished the season bottom of the Super League table, with only one win.

A supporters club (the LBSA) was founded in 2014 in order for fans to have a voice regarding their team. In July, at a pre-match lunch hosted by former Broncos Martin Offiah and Shaun Edwards, the LBSA announced its Hall of Fame, with six inaugural inductees: Reg Bowden, Peter Gill, Mark Johnson, Hussain M’Barki, Rob Purdham, Steele Retchless and Scott Roskell.

2015–2018: Relegation to the Championship
On 13 July 2014, London Broncos were relegated from the Super League to the Championship after a 72–12 loss to Warrington.

The capital club had competed in all 19 Super League seasons and this was the club's first relegation since 1984 as Fulham RL and the first time the club competed in the second tier since 1995.

Relegation bought another mass exodus of players, with the club losing many key homegrown and non-homegrown players.

In the 2015 season, London Broncos had a poor season. Head Coach Joey Grima had issues with senior players like Foran, Cordoba, Mathers, Adamson and Lovegrove which meant that by about a third of the way into the season none were selectable. The club trained players went into the double digits that season but of them only Alex Walker and Matt Davis would be successful in the long run.  As pressure built, Grima resigned leaving Andrew Henderson in charge. Henderson had too much to do and Broncos were a long way short of making the Super 8 play-offs that would have given them a chance of promotion back to Super League. However a surprise away win in the qualifiers at Dewsbury Rams saw the club make it to the Championship Shield Grand Final in Widnes but they were heavily beaten 36–4 by Featherstone Rovers.

In 2016, London Broncos moved to Ealing having signed a three-year deal to play at the Trailfinders Sports Ground, home of rugby union side Ealing Trailfinders. On 3 July, the Broncos beat Dewsbury 36–6 to secure a place in the Qualifiers against the bottom 4 Super League teams for promotion. Henderson signed Penrith Panthers playmaker Jamie Soward, who had previously played for the Broncos in 2013, until the end of the season. London Broncos finished 2nd in the Championship heading into the Qualifiers for a place in the Super League. The Broncos started the Qualifiers with a narrow 34–30 away loss to Leigh. London then won their first game in the competition, setting a record club score victory over Batley 76–16 at the Trailfinders Sports Ground. The following week, Henderson's team put in a gutsy performance despite going down 28–42 to Leeds in front of a record rugby league crowd at the ground of 1,845 in front of the Sky Sports cameras.

In 2017 the Broncos again finished second and reached the qualifiers for a second consecutive year. The team put in several impressive performances including a close 38–40 loss against Warrington Wolves; lost by just two points against Catalans Dragons away and came within six points of beating Hull KR. However the last two games were both hammerings whilst Broncos also blew the lead against Featherstone to draw on the hooter and only actually beat Halifax. Shortly after the season finished Andrew Henderson, who had successfully managed the club through a troubled period, left to help manage Warrington Wolves.

Danny Ward was promoted to Head Coach and in 2018 the Broncos got off to a flying start with seven wins in a row to go first in the Championship table with five straight wins, breaking their previous record for the best start to a season with a 68–12 home victory over Batley Bulldogs. A mid-season slump saw the club needing an improbable sequence of results to make the play-offs but six wins and a draw from the last seven saw the club achieve exactly that and make Super 8s – the Qualifiers.

2018–present: Promotion and subsequent relegation
Following a strong 2018 campaign in the Championship, Danny Ward carried off the Championship Head Coach of the Year Award at the end of season awards dinner held at the Principal Hotel in Manchester. The Broncos finished second in the regular season and commenced their Super 8s – Qualifiers campaign with a one-point win over the Widnes Vikings in which Jarrod Sammut kicked a vital 79th minute drop goal to secure the victory. This good start was followed up with key victories over Salford, Toulouse and Halifax to leave the Broncos with 8 points in the Qualifiers table sitting in fifth behind the Toronto Wolfpack in fourth, which meant London would face the Wolfpack away at the Lamport Stadium in Toronto on 7 October 2018 to decide the final Super League place in the so-called 'Million Pound Game'. London won a very tense and defensive game 4–2, thus earning promotion to Super League for the 2019 season. However, in spite of handing table leaders St Helens two of their three losses in the 2019 season, and several other notable wins against stronger opponents, Broncos were relegated after only one season back in the top flight, after losing their final game of the season to Wakefield.

With the entire 2020 Championship season cancelled due to the COVID-19 pandemic, the RFL advised the Broncos that their present ground at Ealing would be deemed as unsuitable for top level matches should they return to the Super League, so in December 2020 the club entered into discussions with AFC Wimbledon to groundshare at their newly built Plough Lane stadium in Wimbledon. In the 2022 RFL Championship season, London started poorly and for most of the season were in the relegation zone. The club managed to win four of their last ten matches in the league to avoid relegation and finish 11th  on the table.

Stadium

The Broncos have played home matches at numerous different grounds around London since the club's original formation. In 2021 they hoped to move their home ground to Plough Lane stadium in Wimbledon, as tenants of AFC Wimbledon, looking to agree a ten-year lease with break and extension clauses. Until an arrangement to use Plough Lane was reached, the club continued to play at Trailfinders Sports Ground. The Broncos finally began play at Plough Lane in 2022.

Colours and badge

Colours
The original Fulham team wore an all black kit, with a broad white chevron, bordered with red, across the chest. As London Crusaders, the kit used the same colours, but in a variety of designs over the seasons. London Broncos wore red, yellow and blue also in a variety of styles, with red being the predominant colour for the last 5 years of their existence. When the club became known as Harlequins RL they adopted the colours of host rugby union side Harlequins. When the club returned to being known as the London Broncos, the home kit was black with a light blue trim and the reverse for the away kit. In 2015, the London Broncos reverted to their original Fulham colours, much to the approval of long-term fans, with their home kit being predominantly black with a broad white chevron and a red strip bordering the chevron. The away kit is predominantly red with a broad black chevron with white border. For the 2022 season, the club will play in blue and yellow, referencing the traditional colours of their new hosts in Wimbledon. The club have indicated that they will revert to Black from 2023.

Badge

As Fulham RLFC, the club utilised the badge of the host football club, which at the time was the emblem of the local administrative borough, Hammersmith and Fulham. The first badge as London Broncos was a red and white crest with a horse's head on the front with London inscripted on the top. This was worn, with some minor adjustments, until 2006 when the club became known as Harlequins RL.

As Harlequins RL, the club crest was the same as that of the host rugby union team. This was used up until 2011.

In 2012, the club reverted to the name London Broncos and created a new crest, based on the original Broncos badge but featuring a horse's head in a modern stylised fashion, depicted in silver and blue.

Kit sponsors and manufacturers

2023 squad
Where a player has played internationally for more than one country, the nations are indicated with the most recently represented first.  A slash (/) indicates an uncapped player of dual nationality.

2023 transfers

Gains

Losses

Club officials

Backroom staff
 Chairman: David Hughes
 CEO: Jason Loubser
 Head of Commercial: James Milner
 Football Manager: Dom Fenton
 Head of Community: John Keyes
 Commercial: Izzy Lovell
 Head of Medical: 
 1st Team / Lead Academy Physiotherapist: 
 Sports therapist:

Coaching staff
 Head coach: Jermaine Coleman
 Assistant coach: 
 Head of Youth: Rob Powell
 U19s Head Coach : Huw Goodwin

List of former head coaches
Also see :Category:London Broncos coaches.

  Reg Bowden: 1980–1984
  Roy Lester: 1984–1986
  Bill Goodwin: 1986–1987
  Bev Risman: 1987–1988
  Bill Goodwin: 1988
  Phil Sullivan: Jan–Feb 1989
  Bill Goodwin: Feb–May 1989
  Ross Strudwick: 1989–1992
  Darryl van der Velde: 1992–1993
  Tony Gordon: 1993–1994
  Gary Greinke: 1994–1996
  Tony Currie: 1996–1998
  Dan Stains: 1998–1999
 
  John Monie: 1999–2000
  Tony Rea: 2000–2005
  Brian McDermott: 2006–2010
  Rob Powell: 2011–2012
  Tony Rea: 2012–2014
  Joey Grima: 2014–2015
  Andrew Henderson: 2015–2017
  Danny Ward: 2018–2021
  Jermaine Coleman : 2022 
  Mike Eccles : 2022 -

Seasons

Honours
League
Division 1 / Super League:
Runners up (1): 1997
Division 2 / Championship:
Winners (1): 1982–83
Runners up (1): 2018
Million Pound Game:
Winners (1): 2018

Domestic Cups
Challenge Cup:
Runners up (1): 1999

Records

Individual player records

 Most tries in a game (any competition): 5 by Max Clarke (academy) vs Widnes, 5 May 2019
 Most tries in a game (league): 5 by Sean Morris vs Batley Bulldogs, 13 September 2015
 Most tries in a season (any competition): 43 by Mark Johnson, 1993–94
 Most tries in a season (Super League): 24 by Denis Moran, 2003
 Most career tries (any competition): 104 by Luke Dorn, 2005–2006, 2009–2013
 Most career tries (Super League): 74 by Denis Moran, 2001–04
 Most goals in a game (any competition): 13 by Rob Purdham vs Barrow Raiders, 20 May 2006
 Most goals in a game (Super League): 12 by Paul Sykes vs Wakefield Trinity Wildcats, 27 February 2005
 Most goals in a season (any competition): 159 by John Gallagher, 1993–94
 Most goals in a season (Super League): 120 by Paul Sykes, 2005
 Most career goals (any competition): 309 by Steve Diamond, 1981–84
 Most career goals (Super League): 229 by Paul Sykes, 2001–06
 Most points in a game (any competition): 34 by Rob Purdham vs Barrow Raiders, 20 May 2006
 Most points in a game (Super League): 28 by Greg Barwick vs Castleford Tigers, 25 August 1996
 Most points in a season (any competition): 384 by John Gallagher, 1993–94
 Most points in a season (Super League): 290 by Paul Sykes, 2005
 Most career points (any competition): 772 by Paul Sykes, 2001–07
 Most career points (Super League): 750 by Paul Sykes, 2001–07
 Most career appearances: 202 by Steele Retchless, 1998–2004
 Most tackles made in any Super League Match: 66 by Steele Retchless (against Bradford in 1998. This is an all-time Super League record)

Team records
Biggest win: 
82–0 v.  Highfield (12 November 1995)
Biggest loss: 
66-10 v.  Warrington Wolves (13 May 2018)

Attendance Records
Highest home attendance: 
15,013 v.  Wakefield (at Craven Cottage, 15 February 1981)

Supporters' Player of the Year Awards
The London Broncos Supporters Association (LBSA) inaugurated the Fan's Player and Young Player of the Year awards in 2014, with Matt Cook and Joe Keyes the first winners. The award has been held every year, with the exception of the cancelled 2020 season. In 2022, a Women's Player of the Year was awarded for the first time.

LBSA Men's Player of the Year
2014 –  Matt Cook (1)

2015 –  Wes Naiqama (1)

2016 –  Rhys Williams (1)

2017 –  Jarrod Sammut (1)

2018 –  Eddie Battye (1)

2019 –  Jordan Abdull (1)

2020 - Season cancelled due to the COVID-19 pandemic

2021 -  Chris Hankinson (1)

2022 -  Dean Parata (1)

LBSA Men's Young Player of the Year
2014 –  Joe Keyes (1)

2015 –  Matt Davis (1)

2016 –  James Cunningham (1)

2017 –  Alex Walker (1)

2018 –  Alex Walker (2)

2019 –  Rob Butler (1)

2020 - Season cancelled due to the COVID-19 pandemic

2021 -  Gideon Boafo (1)

2022 -  Oli Leyland (1)

LBSA Women's Player of the Year
2022 -  Courtney Treco

Hall of Fame
In 2014, the LBSA launched the club's Hall of Fame, and announced seven inaugural inductees. As of 2019, the Hall of Fame has 11 members:

 Reg Bowden
 Peter Gill
 Mark Johnson
 Hussein M'Barki
 Rob Purdham
 Steele Retchless
 Scott Roskell
 Tony Rea (Inducted 2015)
 Tony Gourley (Inducted 2016)
 Luke Dorn (Inducted 2019)
 Roy Lester (Inducted 2019)

Women's team

Beginning in June 2021, London Broncos will field a women's team to play in the inaugural season of the RFL Women's Super League South.

Seasons

See also

 Sport in London

Notes

References

External links 

 

 
1980 establishments in England
Rugby clubs established in 1980
English rugby league teams
Rugby league teams in London
Super League teams
Sport in the London Borough of Richmond upon Thames